The University of Sahiwal is a public university located in Sahiwal, Punjab, Pakistan.

History & overview
In January 2005, Bahauddin Zakariya University, Multan (BZU) established a sub-campus in Sahiwal inaugurated by the then Governor of the Punjab in 2005. In 2015, Provincial Assembly of the Punjab passed an act under which sub-campus was upgraded to a full-fledged university named University of Sahiwal.

Academics
The university offers degree programs in the following disciplines:

Computer Science
Information Technology
Software Engineering
English
Business Administration
Economics
Commerce 
Applied Psychology
Chemistry
Physics
Law
Statistics
Mathematics

See also 
 Government College Women University, Sialkot
 Government College Women University, Faisalabad
 University of Okara
 Government Sadiq College Women University, Bahawalpur
 Women University Multan

References

External links 
 Official website

Public universities in Punjab, Pakistan
Public universities and colleges in Punjab, Pakistan
Educational institutions established in 2005
2005 establishments in Pakistan
Universities and colleges in Sahiwal District